Iridomyrmex angusticeps is an ant of the genus Iridomyrmex. Described by Forel in 1901, the species is distributed in Australia, and also elsewhere in Papua New Guinea and the Philippines. Two pins of the Iridomyrmex angusticeps in the Australian National Insect Collection were collected on the island of Mindanao on the Philippines.

References

Iridomyrmex
Hymenoptera of Australia
Insects described in 1901